Platyptilia pulverulenta is a moth of the family Pterophoridae. It is found in New Zealand.

The wingspan is about 23 mm. The head is whitish, and the antennae are reddish brown mixed with whitish. The thorax is reddish brown densely mixed with white, and the abdomen is greyish brown. The forewings are reddish brown, sprinkled with white. The hindwings are pale reddish brown.

References

Moths described in 1923
pulverulenta
Endemic fauna of New Zealand
Moths of New Zealand
Endemic moths of New Zealand